A harp is a type of stringed musical instrument.

Harp, harps, HARP, or variation, may also refer to:

Art, entertainment, and media

Music
 Blues harp, a style of harmonica-playing in blues
 French harp, or harmonica
 Jew's harp or Jaw harp, an instrument that is placed in the performer's mouth and plucked
 String Quartet No. 10 (Beethoven), nicknamed the "Harp"
 HARP, a 1985 folk album, and an acronym of the artist names, Holly Near, Arlo Guthrie, Ronnie Gilbert, and Pete Seeger

Other arts, entertainment, and media
 Harp (magazine), a former music magazine
 "Harp", an episode of the television series Teletubbies
 High Adventure Role Playing, a role-playing game

Brands and enterprises
 Harps Food Stores, a supermarket chain in the central U.S.
 Harp Lager, a brand of beer

Geography
 Harp Lake, a lake in Newfoundland and Labrador, Canada
 Harp Lake, Ontario, a lake

Science and technology
 HARP (Hadron Production Experiment), an experiment at the CERN Proton Synchrotron
 HARP algorithm, a medical image analysis algorithm for processing tagged magnetic resonance images
 Heparin affinity regulatory peptide, the protein Pleiotrophin
 Heterodyne Array Receiver Program, a heterodyne array receiver at the James Clerk Maxwell Telescope
 High Accuracy Radial Velocity Planet Searcher (HARPS), a spectrograph (at La Silla Observatory in Chile) used in astronomy
 High Aspect Ratio Porous Surface (HARPS), an electric thruster system for very small spacecraft
 Hyper-Angular Rainbow Polarimeter #2 (HARP2), a wide-angle imaging polarimeter on the NASA satellite Plankton, Aerosol, Cloud, ocean Ecosystem (PACE)
 Project HARP, a US-Canada ballistics research project famous for its extremely large gun

Other uses
 Harp (surname)
 The Harps GAA, an Irish sports club
 Home Affordable Refinance Program, a US government program to help homeowners refinance their mortgages
 Lamp harp

See also

 Harpe (disambiguation)
 Harper (disambiguation)
 Harpsichord
 HAARP (High Frequency Active Auroral Research Program)
 HAARP (album), a 2008 live album and video by English rock band Muse